In Greek mythology, Tisiphone (Ancient Greek: Τισιφόνη) may refer to various characters:

 Tisiphone, one of the Erinyes, goddesses of vengeance.
 Tisiphone, daughter of Alcmaeon, one of the Epigoni, and Manto, daughter of the seer Tiresias. She was the sister of Amphilochus. Tisiphone was given by her father to King Creon of Corinth to be brought up but was instead sold as a slave by the latter's wife, who feared her beauty; coincidentally she was bought by her father, not knowing that she was his daughter, and kept by him as a maid.
 Tisiphone, the Trojan daughter of Antimachus and wife of Meneptolemus.

Notes

References 

 Apollodorus, The Library with an English Translation by Sir James George Frazer, F.B.A., F.R.S. in 2 Volumes, Cambridge, MA, Harvard University Press; London, William Heinemann Ltd. 1921. ISBN 0-674-99135-4. Online version at the Perseus Digital Library. Greek text available from the same website.
 Quintus Smyrnaeus, The Fall of Troy translated by Way. A. S. Loeb Classical Library Volume 19. London: William Heinemann, 1913. Online version at theio.com
 Quintus Smyrnaeus, The Fall of Troy. Arthur S. Way. London: William Heinemann; New York: G.P. Putnam's Sons. 1913. Greek text available at the Perseus Digital Library.

Trojans
Women in Greek mythology
People of the Trojan War
Corinthian mythology
Mythology of Argos